Zhang Chu (born 17 November 1968) is a Chinese musician who was born in Liuyang, Hunan.

Career
Zhang Chu's first single, "Sister", was released in 1992.  That same year, he recorded a rock cover of the propaganda song "Socialism is Good", for his Red Rock album.

Albums
1992 Sister  in China Fire I
1993 A Heart Cannot Fawn
1994 "Shameful being Left Alone" (official title) AKA "Loners are disgraceful"()
1995 My Eyelashes Are Almost Blown Away By The Wind in A Tribute To Zhang Ju (zaijian 张炬)
1996 Known in China Fire II
1997 Aeroplane Factory
1998 So Big in China Fire III

See also 
 C-Rock/Sino-Rock

References

External links
Zhang Chu Website (Chinese)
West of Yang Guan (English/Chinese)
Chinese Rock Database: Zhang Chu (Japanese)

1968 births
Chinese rock musicians
Living people
Musicians from Changsha
People from Liuyang
People's Republic of China composers
People's Republic of China poets
Poets from Hunan
Chinese male singer-songwriters
Chinese rock singers
Chinese guitarists
Singers from Hunan
Writers from Changsha